The Bondwell-2 was an early laptop personal computer running the CP/M operating system. Introduced by Bondwell in 1985, it came with a Zilog Z80 CPU clocked at 4 MHz, 64 kB RAM and 4 kB ROM. It had a 3.5" floppy disk drive, highly unusual for a CP/M system, as this OS was largely outmoded by the time 3.5" drives were introduced. 

The Bondwell-2's main attraction was its price, at 995 USD it also included MicroPro's complete line of CP/M software, including WordStar. Also unusually for a CP/M system, the Bondwell-2 was capable of displaying bitmapped graphics. The flip-up LCD display's resolution was 640x200 pixels, or 80x25 text characters. A 300 baud modem was available as an option.

References

External links 
 vintage-computer.com: Bondwell 2 Laptop, vintage-computer.com
 

Early laptops
CP/M
Computer-related introductions in 1985